Cleopatra is a novel written by Jeffrey K. Gardner, first published in 1962. with a cover painted by Robert Abbett.

The book is about Cleopatra, ruler of Egypt. It explores her secret life and many loves, including Julius Caesar and Mark Antony, one of Caesar's supporters.  The novel is described as a "frank novel of a woman whose sensual appeal has never been equalled".

References

American historical novels
1962 American novels
Novels set in ancient Egypt
Fictional depictions of Cleopatra in literature
Pyramid Books books